Tout Puissant Mazembe, commonly referred to as TP Mazembe, is a Congolese professional football club based in Lubumbashi.

History
Tout Puissant Mazembe, the first sports club from the Democratic Republic of the Congo with a value of at least $10 million, was originally founded by the Benedictine monks who directed the Institut Saint-Boniface school in Élisabethville (modern-day Lubumbashi) in Katanga Province. The missionaries originally decided in 1939 to established a football team for the students' Boy Scout troop, named Saint Georges FC, after the patron saint of the Scouting movement. This team affiliated itself directly in the first division of the Royal Federation of the Native Athletic Associations (Fédération Royale des Associations Sportives Indigènes, FRASI) founded by the Belgian King. At the end of the season, Holy Georges placed 3rd.

In 1944 the young scouts went on the road and FC St. Georges was rechristened Saint Paul F.C. Some years later, the incorporation of certain foreign elements in the Institute would make the missionaries abandon the team management. The team took the name of F.C. Englebert after its sponsor, a tire brand. The qualifier "Tout Puissant" (Almighty) was added to the club's name after it went undefeated in winning its first league title in 1966.

After the independence of Congo, (30 June 1960) Englebert restructured itself. In 1966, they realized the treble (national Championship, Coupe du Congo and Katanga Cup).

In 1967 and 1968, it won the African Cup of Champions. The team would be finalist four times successively in (1967, 1968, 1969 and 1970). Mazembe was the first team to successfully defend the African Champions Cup. This feat was finally repeated in 2003 and 2004 by Enyimba.

After 18 years of absence, it returned to the African scene thanks to 38-year-old governor Moïse Katumbi Chapwe and owner of the club.

In November 2009 the team won the CAF Champions League against Heartland 2–2 on aggregate, winning on the away goals rule.

By winning the CAF Champions League, they qualified for the 2009 FIFA Club World Cup. In their first match in the quarter-finals they lost 2–1 to Pohang Steelers of South Korea,  despite taking the lead in the first half. Following a 3–2 defeat to Auckland City in the fifth placed match they finished the tournament in 6th place.

In 2010 they retained the 2010 CAF Champions League, and in December they became the first African side to contest the final of the FIFA Club World Cup after defeating both Pachuca of Mexico 1–0 in the quarter-finals and Internacional of Brazil 2–0 in the semi-finals.
In the final on 18 December, they were defeated 3–0 by Internazionale.

In 2015, TP Mazembe secured their fifth title in the competition after defeating USM Alger of Algeria 4–1 aggregate in the 2015 CAF Champions League Final.

Women's football
In 2020, a women's section of TP Mazembe was formed.

Crest and colours

Kit manufacturers and shirt sponsors

Honours 

With 26 titles at national level and 11 at international level since 1966, TP Mazembe is currently the most successful club of the DRC with 37 titles.

National 

Linafoot
 Champions (19): 1966, 1967, 1969, 1976, 1987, 2000, 2001, 2006, 2007, 2009, 2011, 2012, 2013, 2013–14, 2015–16, 2016–17, 2018–19, 2019–20, 2021–2022 (Record)

Congo Cup
 Champions (5): 1966, 1967, 1976, 1979, 2000

DR Congo Super Cup
 Champions (3): 2013, 2014, 2016 (Record)

International 

African Cup of Champions Clubs / CAF Champions League
  Champions (5): 1967, 1968, 2009, 2010, 2015

CAF Confederation Cup
 Champions (2): 2016, 2017

CAF Super Cup
  Champions (3): 2010, 2011, 2016

African Cup Winners' Cup
 Champions: 1980

FIFA Club World Cup
 Runners-up: 2010

Performance in CAF competitions
African Cup of Champions Clubs / CAF Champions League: 25 appearances
The club have 7 appearances in African Cup of Champions Clubs from 1967 to 1988 and 18 appearances in CAF Champions League from 2001 till now, having appeared in every edition since 2007.

1967 – Champion
1968 – Champion
1969 – Finalist
1970 – Finalist
1972 – Semi-finals
1977 – First Round
1988 – First Round
2001 – Group Stage

2002 – Semi-finals
2005 – Preliminary Round
2007 – Second Round
2008 – Group Stage
2009 – Champion
2010 – Champion
2011 – Disqualified in Second Round
2012 – Semi-finals

2013 – Second Round
2014 – Semi-finals
2015 – Champions
2016 – Second Round
2017 – First Round
2018 – Quarter-finals
2018–19 – Semi-finals
2019–20 – Quarter-finals
2020–21 – Group Stage

CAF Cup / CAF Confederation Cup: 7 appearances
The club have 1 appearance in CAF Cup in 2000 and 6 appearances in CAF Confederation Cup from 2004 till now.

2000 – Second Round
2004 – First Round
2006 – disqualified in First Round

2007 – Group Stage
2013 – Finalist
2016 – Champion

2017 – Champion

CAF Cup Winners' Cup: 2 appearances
1980 – Champion
1981 – Second Round

CAF Super Cup: 5 appearances
2010 – Champion
2011 – Champion
2016 – Champion
2017 – Finalist
2018 – Finalist

Current squad

Notable former players

For details on former players see :Category:TP Mazembe players.

See also

References

External links

 
FIFA Club World Cup Profile

 
Football clubs in the Democratic Republic of the Congo
Football clubs in Lubumbashi
Association football clubs established in 1939
1939 establishments in the Belgian Congo
Sports clubs in the Democratic Republic of the Congo
CAF Champions League winning clubs
CAF Confederation Cup winning clubs
African Cup Winners Cup winning clubs
CAF Super Cup winning clubs